Hazel Dawn (born Henrietta Hazel Tout; March 23, 1890 – August 28, 1988) was an American stage, film and television actress, and violinist. She was born to a Mormon family in Utah, and studied music in Europe where her father was a missionary. Dawn rose to fame as a stage actress in Ivan Caryll's 1911 Broadway production of The Pink Lady, which ran for over 300 performances and earned Dawn the eponymous nickname. She performed extensively on Broadway and began work in film in 1914, appearing in a total of 13 feature films. Dawn died at age 98 in New York City.

Early life
Dawn was born Henrietta Hazel Tout in Ogden, Utah, in 1890. She went to Wales with her family at the age of eight when her father served as a Mormon missionary there. Dawn studied violin and voice in London, Paris, and Munich. She especially was impressed by the attentiveness of teachers she studied under in Paris. Her sister, Nancy Tout, was an opera singer who sang with the Opera Comique in Paris.

Career

Stage work
She met producer Ivan Caryll at a party in London. Caryll suggested the name Hazel Dawn, considering Tout to be "impossible." Dawn met composer Paul Rubens who offered her a part in Dear Little Denmark at the Prince of Wales Theatre (1909), where she made her theatrical début. She then starred in The Balkan Princess in 1910 as Olga. She achieved a great success with her performance in Ivan Caryll's The Pink Lady (1911). The show ran a total of 316 performances on Broadway and then toured, making Dawn famous, even though she was not the leading lady. In the production, she introduced My Beautiful Lady, which she sang and played on her violin. Subsequently she was known as "The Pink Lady" and the cocktail may have been named for her.

The Little Cafe (1913) was produced by the New Amsterdam Theatre and adapted from a book by C.M.S. McLellan. One reviewer found the play lacking when compared to The Pink Lady, but he enjoyed the song Just Because It's You. Dawn performed it in the third act. He wrote: "Dawn was radiantly beautiful and sang far better than did other members of the cast." The Little Cafe was a place in Paris where large crowds assembled to admire the renowned beauty of the owner's daughter.

She starred in the operetta The Debutante (1914) at the National Theater in Washington, D.C. under the management of John C. Fisher. Harry B. Smith wrote the book and play adaptation. The setting of the operetta is in London and Paris, with Dawn's depicting a young American girl who is pursued by a nobleman, who desires her fortune. She plays the violin during a scene where she runs away to Paris and makes her musical debut before an appreciative audience. In December, she appeared in The Debutante at the Knickerbocker Theatre. The many shows she appeared in include The Great Temptations, Getting Gertie's Garter, and The Demi-Virgin as well as vaudeville. Her last appearance on Broadway was in Wonder Boy (1931).

She emerged from retirement in June 1948 to appear on stage with her daughter Hazel Dawn Jr. in a revival of Ruth Gordon’s play Years Ago at the Casino Theatre, Newport RI.

Transition to film

She made her screen debut as Kate Shipley in One of Our Girls (1914). Her association with Famous Players-Lasky film company dated from this movie. Dawn followed this role with others in Niobe (1915), Clarissa (1915), and The Masqueraders (1915). Niobe is the screen version of a play written by Harry and Edward S. Paulton. She made The Fatal Card (1915) with Paramount Pictures.

In My Lady Incog (1916), Dawn played a female detective in a movie that is a mystery film, comedy, and a romance. Playing the character Nell Carroll, she co-starred with George Majeroni. In The Lone Wolf (1917), she acts with Bert Lytell in an adaptation of a novel by Louis Joseph Vance. Producer Herbert Brenon was responsible for adaptation to film from the book. Her last film credit was Devotion (1921).

Personal life
Dawn married Charles Edward Gruwell, a mining engineer from Montana, in 1927. At the time, Gruwell was purported to be one of the "richest men in the West." The couple had two children, Dawn Gruwell and Charles E. Gruwell. Her daughter had a career as an actor and singer on film, television and Broadway under the name Hazel Dawn Jr. Many public records confuse the two.

Following Gruwell's death in 1941, Dawn worked in the casting department of J. Walter Thompson advertising agency. She retired in 1963.

Dawn made a claim for $4,643 against the London Theatre Company, which filed for bankruptcy in August 1915. The company, which produced and staged plays, was located at 1476 Broadway. Dawn was once the mascot of both the U.S. Military Academy and the U.S. Naval Academy at one of their annual football games. At one point, West Point cadets tossed their hats onto the stage, one of them belonging to future U.S. President Dwight D. Eisenhower.

Death
Hazel Dawn died at the home of her daughter in Manhattan in 1988 at age 98.

Legacy
Actress Ruth Gordon cited Dawn as her own inspiration for becoming an actress. Gordon, who was five years younger, predeceased Dawn, dying in 1985. A 14-year-old Adele Astaire, sister of Fred, saw Dawn's performance in The Pink Lady and idolized her, thinking her to be "the most lovely, graceful creature" she had seen.

In 1953, Dawn was portrayed by Kay Williams in the film The Actress.

Filmography

References

Works cited

Further reading

External links

 
 
 Hazel Dawn photo gallery NY Public Library Billy Rose Collection

Latter Day Saints from Utah
American musical theatre actresses
American silent film actresses
American stage actresses
American television actresses
People from Ogden, Utah
Vaudeville performers
1890 births
1988 deaths
20th-century American actresses
Actresses from Utah
20th-century American violinists
Ziegfeld girls
American expatriates in England
American expatriates in Germany
American expatriates in France
20th-century American women singers
Latter Day Saints from New York (state)
20th-century American singers